Roh Kyung-ho (born 5 July 2000) is a South Korean footballer currently playing as a midfielder for Pohang Steelers.

Career statistics

Club

Notes

References

2000 births
Living people
South Korean footballers
Association football midfielders
K League 1 players
Pohang Steelers players